Bird Is Free is an album by Charlie Parker that documents a concert given at Rockland Palace, New York City, on 26 September 1952.

Reception

The DownBeat reviewer, Leonard Feather, identified limitations of the audio quality, and added: "When Parker begins to play, however, you will forget all about distractions. ... There is brilliant, boiling, poetic Bird in a variety of attitudes here." The AllMusic review concluded: "Throughout, Parker plays with inimitable style and good humor and his quartet, featuring the great drummer Max Roach, swings effortlessly".

Track listing
Side 1
 Rocker (Gerry Mulligan)
 Sly Mongoose (Jamaican trad.)
 Moose the Mooche (Parker)
 Star Eyes (Gene de Paul, Don Raye)

Side 2
 This Time the Dream's on Me (Harold Arlen, Johnny Mercer)
 Cool Blues (Parker)
 My Little Suede Shoes (Parker)
 Lester Leaps In (Lester Young)
 Laura (Raksin, Mercer)

Personnel
Charlie Parker – alto sax
Mundell Lowe – guitar
Walter Bishop, Jr. – piano
Teddy Kotick – bass
Max Roach – drums
unidentified strings on "Rocker" and "Laura"

See also
  English translation of German Wikipedia Bird Is Free article with many details

References

External links
 Bird Is Free at jazzdisco.org

Charlie Parker albums
1961 live albums